Mordellistena fairmairei is a beetle in the genus Mordellistena of the family Mordellidae. It was described in 1915 by Csiki.

References

fairmairei
Beetles described in 1915